Allorhizobium is a genus of Gram-negative soil bacteria. Some species of Allorhizobium form an endosymbiotic nitrogen-fixing association with roots of legumes, while others are known to cause crown gall.

References

Rhizobiaceae
Bacteria genera